The 1974 New Zealand tour rugby to Australia and Fiji was the 22nd tour by the New Zealand national rugby union team to Australia and ended with a match at Fiji.

The last tour of "All Blacks" in Australia was the 1968 tour.

Australians visited New Zealand in 1972.

All Backs won two test matches and the Bledisloe Cup. Another test was tied.

Results 
Scores and results list New Zealand's points tally first.

External links 
 New Zealand in Australia and Fiji 1974 from rugbymuseum.co.nz

New Zealand
New Zealand tour
Australia tour
Australia tour
New Zealand national rugby union team tours of Australia
New Zealand national rugby union team tours
Rugby union tours of Fiji